Mill Street Brewery is a brewery in Toronto, Ontario, Canada that is a part of Anheuser–Busch InBev and named after Mill Street where it is located. During its first decade of operation, as an independent brewer, Mill Street won several awards including Golden Tap Awards for Best Toronto Microbrewery ('04-'08) and Best Toronto Beer (for Tankhouse Ale: '04-'07), and was named "Canadian Brewery of the Year" at the Canadian Brewing Awards in 2007, 2008, and 2009. It was purchased in 2015 by Canadian brewer Labatt Brewing Company, which in turn is owned by the global brewing giant Anheuser–Busch InBev.

History

The brewery was founded in December 2002 in Toronto by Steve Abrams, Jeff Cooper and Michael Duggan. The brewery was named after its original location at 55 Mill Street in the historic Distillery District, the former industrial complex occupied by spirits maker Gooderham and Worts.  In early 2006, all large-scale brewing was moved to a bigger facility in Scarborough, Ontario, and the Distillery District location reopened in October, 2006 as a brewpub. The brewpub features 14 Mill Street beers on draught, including seasonal and other special/one-off releases. In 2007, co-founder Michael Duggan felt the company was diverging from its original vision, and left to start his own brewery.

In 2011, the company leased a historic grist mill building adjacent to the Chaudière Falls in Ottawa and converted it into a brewpub. The building is owned by the National Capital Commission and most recently housed The Mill (Old Mill Restaurant), a restaurant that closed in 2007 and a 140-year-old former grist mill. Also in 2011, with the opening of a pub in Terminal 1 of Toronto Pearson International Airport, Mill Street became the first craft brewer to open a bar/restaurant in a major Canadian airport.  

In spring 2013, Mill Street expanded their Distillery District operation and added a distillery that distills schnapps from beer.

In 2015, Mill Street was purchased by Labatt, which is itself owned by brewing giant Anheuser-Busch InBev. As part of the purchase agreement, Labatt agreed to invest $10 million into brewing operations to help expand into Quebec. Due to the takeover, the Ontario Craft Brewers no longer considered Mill St. to be an independent craft brewer and removed Mill St. from its membership.

References

External links

 

Food and drink companies established in 2002
Beer brewing companies based in Ontario
2002 establishments in Ontario
Companies based in Scarborough, Toronto
Manufacturing companies based in Toronto
Canadian beer brands